Willem "Wim" Dik (11 January 1939 – 19 June 2022) was a Dutch politician.

Biography
He was the head of KPN NV, Holland's formerly state-owned postal and telecom service. On behalf of Democrats 66 (D66) he was a State Secretary in the Third Van Agt cabinet from 1981 to 1982.

References 

1939 births
2022 deaths
Delft University of Technology alumni
Democrats 66 politicians
Dutch chief executives
Grand Officers of the Order of Orange-Nassau
Politicians from Rotterdam
State Secretaries for Economic Affairs of the Netherlands